"Boom Boom Beat or "O Edo Nagareboshi IV" is a single from Puffy AmiYumi. 
The song "Oh Edo Nagareboshi IV" was used as the opening theme for the anime Oh! Edo Rocket.

Track listing
1. boom boom beat(Anders Hellgren & David Myhr) - 3:19
2. お江戸流れ星IV(O Edo Nagareboshi IV/Oh Edo Shooting Star IV) (Pierre Taki/Anders Hellgren & David Myhr) - 3:48
3. きみがすき

Chart performance
The single peaked at number 47 on the singles chart, selling 2.864 copies that week, and stayed on the chart for 4 weeks.

References

2007 singles
2007 songs
Puffy AmiYumi songs
Ki/oon Music singles